Aurora Evelyn Clark (born Dec. 12, 1976) is an American computational chemist. She is a Professor in the Department of Chemistry at the University of Utah and a Fellow of the American Chemical Society, American Physical Society, and American Association for the Advancement of Science.

Early life and education
Clark was born Dec. 12, 1976 in Fresno, California. As a young child her family moved to the Methow Valley in north-central Washington State. As she grew up on a farm, Clark first enrolled in veterinary science at Central Washington University (CWU), however undergraduate mentoring and research in the laboratory of Joann Peters in the Chemistry Department at CWU inspired a deep love of computational and theoretical chemistry. Clark earned her PhD in physical chemistry at Indiana University under the mentorship of quantum chemist Ernest R. Davidson and inorganic chemist Jeffrey Zalesky.  Her thesis focused upon the development of projection operators to provide new insight into molecular properties related to electron spin pairing. She then completed a Directors postdoctoral fellowship at Los Alamos National Laboratory under the mentorship of Richard L. Martin and P. Jeffrey Hay, where she studied the chemical interactions and bonding of heavy element complexes.

Career
Following her postdoctoral fellowship, Clark joined the chemistry department at Washington State University (WSU) in 2005, focusing upon the study of complex aqueous solutions. The challenges associated with non-ideal solution chemistry and soft-matter more broadly,  her research group began employing and adapting graph theory methods to reveal the patterns of interactions and multidimensional correlations of solution structure. Work in her laboratory adapted Google's PageRank algorithm to identify local and extended structures in solution, and to explore energy landscapes of chemical transformations. In more recent years, Clark and her collaborators have expanded to adapt tools from topological data analysis and geometric measure theory to study chemical reactions, energy landscapes, and soft-matter interfaces.

Clark has been very active in service to the Chemistry community and Washington State University. At WSU, Clark was the interim director of the materials science and engineering PhD program as well as the WSU-PNNL Nuclear Science and Technology Institute prior to her current role as the Director of the Center for Institutional Research Computing. As a result of her research in simulating highly radioactive systems, Clark was named deputy director of the IDREAM center, one of four DOE Energy Frontier Research Centers intended to expedite the cleanup of sites contaminated by nuclear weapons production. At the same time, she was also named a Fellow of the American Chemical Society for her "service to the nuclear/inorganic and computational chemistry communities and for her innovative research." The following year, Clark was appointed to a National Academies of Sciences, Engineering, and Medicine’s committee to develop the agenda for basic research in separations science. In 2019, Clark was elected as a Fellow of the American Association for the Advancement of Science for her methods that integrate applied mathematics and chemistry to extract new information from modeling data. She was later also inducted into the American Physical Society for her work in "developing innovative methods to advance the study of complex chemical solutions and their interfaces using molecular simulation and integrating methods from graph theory, topology (shape) and geometry." Her laboratory moved to the University of Utah Department of Chemistry in 2022.

References

External links

Living people
1976 births
Central Washington University alumni
Indiana University Bloomington alumni
Fellows of the American Chemical Society
Fellows of the American Physical Society
Fellows of the American Association for the Advancement of Science